The 1969 St. Louis Cardinals season was the 50th season the team was in the National Football League (NFL).

The team failed to improve on their previous output of 9–4–1, winning only four games. They failed to qualify for the playoffs for the 21st consecutive season.

Despite the presence of future Pro Football Hall of Fame inductees Larry Wilson and Roger Wehrli, as well former All-Pro Jerry Stovall, the Cardinals’ defense allowed 38 passing touchdowns, the second-highest total in pro football history.

Roster

Schedule

Standings

References

External links 
 1969 St. Louis Cardinals at Pro-Football-Reference.com

Arizona Cardinals seasons
St. Louis Cardinals